Agonum micans is a species of ground beetle native to Europe.

References

micans
Beetles described in 1822
Beetles of Europe